Helgøy Church is a historic parish church of the Church of Norway in Karlsøy Municipality in Troms og Finnmark county, Norway. It is located on the small unpopulated island of Helgøya. It is a little-used annex church for the Karlsøy parish which is part of the Tromsø domprosti (arch-deanery) in the Diocese of Nord-Hålogaland.  The 350-seat church is no longer in regular use since the island of Helgøya is no longer populated. The last confirmation class at the church was confirmed in 1966. The population of the island decreased steadily until it no longer had permanent residents. Today, the island is used for summer vacation homes and the church is now only used on occasion for special services, including one summer service each year.

History
The earliest existing historical records of the church date back to the year 1580, but the church was likely built in the late 1400s and was subject to the priest in Tromsø. A new church was built on the site around the year 1660. This was a timber-framed long church with a west tower, sacristy, and an entry porch.

Around 1889, the old church was torn down and replaced with a church from another location. This new church was not actually new—it had a long history before arriving at Helgøy. The building was originally constructed in 1741 as Hemnes Church in Hemnes municipality in Helgeland. Then, in 1872, the building was taken down and moved to Hamn in Berg municipality on Senja island. It was rebuilt there as a church by the nickel plant. When the plant closed in 1888, the church was once again dismantled and moved to Helgøya to replace the earlier church building. This newly rebuilt church was consecrated on 7 March 1889 by the Bishop Johannes Skaar. This "new" white, wooden church was built in a long church style with a steeple. The church seats about 350 people.

See also
List of churches in Nord-Hålogaland

References

Churches in Troms
Wooden churches in Norway
Karlsøy
Churches completed in 1741
Churches completed in 1889
18th-century Church of Norway church buildings
15th-century establishments in Norway